The Brokpa language (Brokpa kay) (Dr˚okpakha, Dr˚opkha), also called the Merak-Sakteng language after its speakers' home regions, is a Southern Tibetic language spoken by about 5,000 people mainly in Mera and Sakteng Gewogs in the Sakteng Valley of Trashigang District in Eastern Bhutan. Brokpa is spoken by descendants of pastoral yakherd communities.

The word brokpa has two parts. 'brok' and 'pa'. In Tibetic 'Brok' means pastoral land and 'pa' is a demonym, so the word 'Brokpa' refers to the language spoken by the people living on the mountains. 
Roger Blench has also recently named a language complex called Senge spoken in three villages northwest of Dirang in West Kameng district.

Dondrup (1993:3) lists the following Brokpa villages.
West Kameng district
Lubrung
Dirme
Sumrang
Nyokmadung
Undra 
Sengedrong
Tawang district
Lagam
Mago
Thingbu
Lakuthang
Bhutan
Sakteng
Merak

The 1981 census counted 1,855 Brokpa people in Arunachal Pradesh.

See also
Languages of Bhutan

References 

Dondrup, Rinchin 1993. Brokeh language guide. Itanagar: Directorate of Research, Arunachal Pradesh Government.

External links 
Himalayan Languages Project

Languages of Bhutan
South Bodish languages